Oktōēchos (here transcribed "Octoechos";; from ὀκτώ "eight" and ἦχος "sound, mode" called echos; Slavonic: Осмогласие, Osmoglasie from о́смь "eight" and гласъ, Glagolitic: , "voice, sound") is the eight-mode system used for the composition of religious chant in Byzantine, Syriac, Armenian, Georgian, Latin and Slavic churches since the Middle Ages. In a modified form the octoechos is still regarded as the foundation of the tradition of monodic chant in the Byzantine Rite today.

Nomenclature

The names ascribed to the eight tones differ in translations into Church Slavonic. The Slavonic system counted the plagioi echoi as glasa 5, 6, 7, and 8. For reference, these differences are shown here together with the Ancient Greek names of the octave species according to the Hagiopolites (see Hagiopolitan Octoechos) and to the chant treatises and tonaries of Carolingian theorists. Fifteenth-century composers like Manuel Chrysaphes, Lampadarios at the Court of Palaiologan Constantinople exchanged the Phrygian with the Lydian. The Armenian names and their temporal cycles are represented in the article about the hymn books octoechos and parakletike.

Southern Slavs use the Byzantine musical system and, nonetheless, use the variant numbering that is always found in Church Slavonic texts.

History 
According to three main periods, which divides the history of the eight-mode system, the former article has been split chronologically:

Analysis
Byzantine Chant performance practice has been computationally compared to the theory by Chrysanthos. The analysis of 94 Byzantine Chants performed by 4 singers showed a tendency of the singers to level theoretic particularities of the echos that stand out of the general norm in the octoechos. In practice, smaller scale degree steps (67-133 cents) appear to be increased and the highest scale step of 333 cents appears to be decreased compared to theory. In practice, the first four scale notes in decreasing order of prominence I, III, II, IV are more prominent than the V., VI., and the VII.

References 

Ancient Greek music theory
Classical and art music traditions
Byzantine music theory
Eastern Orthodox liturgical music
Byzantine Rite
Modes (music)
Ottoman classical music
Tonaries